A mayoral election took place in Buffalo, New York on November 3, 2009. Incumbent Democratic mayor Byron Brown won re-election to a second term.

Primary
The primary election was held on September 15, 2009. Incumbent Mayor Byron Brown defeated South District Councilmember Michael P. Kearns.

General
Under New York's electoral fusion law, Brown received the party endorsements of not only the Democratic party, but also of the Independence, Conservative, and Working Families parties.

The Republican Party did not field a candidate. Independent candidate Matthew Ricchiazzi withdrew from the race after his petition to get on the ballot was rejected by the Board of Elections.  Thus, Brown was unopposed in the general election.

References

External links
Change Buffalo - Official website of Matthew Ricchiazzi
Kearns for Mayor - Official website of Michael P. Kearns
Mayor Byron Brown - Official website of Byron Brown

See also
List of mayors of Buffalo, New York

Buffalo Mayor
Buffalo, New York
Election 2009
2009